Nalón can refer to:

 Nalón (Asturian comarca), in northern Spain
 Nalón (river), a river in the comarca
 Muros de Nalón, a municipality in the comarca